The Illawarra Escarpment State Conservation Area is a protected area located west of Wollongong in  eastern Australia. The conservation area is a popular location for recreation, including bush walking, scenic viewing, picnicking, camping, bird watching, rock climbing and horse riding. The park comprises six separate sections extending over 40 kilometres, from Stanwell Park in the north to Horsely in the south.

The 30-million-year-old site was inhabited by the Wodi Wodi for 20,000 years, and some of the summits in the region are of spiritual significance for the local Aboriginal people. It also has many colonial roads which were built by Surveyor-General Thomas Mitchell and convicts during 1834.

See also 
 Illawarra Escarpment

References

State conservation areas in New South Wales
Forests of New South Wales
Protected areas established in 1980
1980 establishments in Australia